Fernando Torres is a Spanish footballer.

Fernando Torres may also refer to:

Fernando Torres (actor) (1927–2008), Brazilian actor
Fernando Torres de Portugal y Mesía, 16th-century viceroy
Fernando Torres Graciano (born 1970), Mexican politician
Fernando Torres (politician), Uruguayan politician
Fernando Torres (weightlifter) (born 1941), Puerto Rican Olympic weightlifter
Fernando Llorente Torres, Spanish footballer